Type 80 may refer to:

 Type 80 main battle tank, a Chinese tank
 Type 80 Air-to-Ship Missile, a Japanese ASM
 Type 80 (pistol), a Chinese military pistol
 Type 80 machine gun, a Chinese copy of the Soviet PK machine gun

See also
 Class 80 (disambiguation)